Tunku Tan Sri Osman (24 November 1919 – 19 April 1994) was the first Malaysian Armed Forces Chief of Staff. He is a nephew of Tunku Abdul Rahman, Malaysia's first Prime Minister as well as a first cousin to the late Sultan Abdul Halim, the late Tunku Abdul Malik, the late Tunku Annuar and Sultan Sallehuddin since their fathers and The Tunku are brothers (paternal half siblings). General Tunku Osman was known for his strong principles and self-discipline as well as highly respected by the ranks and files of the army.

Background 
Tunku Osman received his early education at the Hutchin School, Penang and later enrolled into the Sultan Abdul Hamid College (SAHC), Alor Star, Kedah. In March 1935, he furthered his studies at the Bristol Grammar School, England. There, he was taken care of and guided by Reginald James MacGregor. When the war broke in Europe, Tunku Osman showed his interest in joining the armed forces when R.J. McGregor's sons joined the Royal Air Force.

Career highlights 
From April to August 1942, Tunku Osman trained with the Gloucester Regiment as a recruit and later joined the 80th Reconnaissance Regiment. He was then sent undergo cadet training at the Highland Fieldcraff Centre in Scotland. He underwent further training at Bovington and was seconded to the Royal Armoured Car Regiment. In 1944, he entered the OCTU at Barmouth, Wales in December 1944 to undergo training as a cadet officer.

In 1945, Tunku Osman joined the Force 136 and was commissioned as second lieutenant (May 1945) and was absorbed into the General List. He continued parachute training and investigations at Calcutta, India. He spearheaded the Malay Guerrilla Group when Force 136 was abolished after surrender of Japan.

In 1946, Tunku Osman joined the British Military Administration (BMA) in Malaya and served in the British Army in Malaya. In 1947 Tunku Osman joined the Royal Malay Regiment (1 February 1947) and was commissioned as lieutenant and assigned to the 2nd Battalion Malay Regiment. He was promoted to captain in February 1951 and later to the rank of major in 1955. The same year, Tunku Osman was sent to attend a Senior Officers course at Devizes, Wiltshire. In 1958, Tunku Osman was assigned to the 6th Battalion and the 7th Malay Regiment as Assistant Commanding Officer.

In July 1958, Tunku Osman was promoted to lieutenant colonel and took command of the 2nd Battalion Malay Regiment. He was the first Malay Commanding Officer of the battalion. In May 1960, Tunku Osman was promoted to the rank of colonel while he was attending the Joint Services Staff College and in June 1960 was promoted to brigadier general and took command of 2nd Malayan Infantry Brigade. In July 1961, Tunku Osman was made "Brigadier of The Army" at the Ministry of Defense.

Appointment as Chief-of-Staff of the Armed Forces
When General Tan Sri Sir Rodney Moore retired as the Chief of Staff of the Armed Forces, Tunku Osman was promoted to major general and appointed as the Chief of Staff of the Armed Forces. He was the first Malayan to hold the highest rank in the Malaysian Armed Forces. Tunku Osman retired from his position on 24 November 1969.

Honours
For his many services and contributions, he was conferred various medals and honours:

Honours of Malaysia
  :
 Companion of the Order of the Defender of the Realm (JMN) (1961)
  :
 Commander of the Order of the Defender of the Realm (PMN) – Tan Sri (1964)
 Recipient of the Malaysian Commemorative Medal (Gold) (PPM) (1965)
 :
 Recipient of the Distinguished Conduct Medal (PPT) (1968)
  :
  Knight Companion of the Order of the Crown of Pahang (DIMP) – Dato' (1969)

Foreign Honours
 :
 Grand Officer of the National Order of Vietnam (1965)
 :
 Second Class of the Order of Diplomatic Service Merit
 :
 Grand Cross (Datu) of the Order of Sikatuna
 Iran:
 Grand Commander of the Order of the Crown
:
 Grand Officer of the Order of the Star of Ethiopia
:
 Knight Grand Cross of the Order of the White Elephant
:
 Burma Star
 British War Medal
 Defence Medal

Death and burial
He died on 19 April 1994 and was buried near Tunku Abdul Rahman's grave at Kedah Royal Mausoleum at Langgar.

References 

 

1919 births
1994 deaths
British Army personnel of World War II
Malaysian Army personnel
Osman
People educated at Bristol Grammar School
Companions of the Order of the Defender of the Realm
People from Kedah
Malaysian people of Malay descent
Malaysian Muslims
Commanders of the Order of the Defender of the Realm
Gloucestershire Regiment soldiers
British Special Operations Executive personnel
Reconnaissance Corps soldiers
Recipients of orders, decorations, and medals of Ethiopia